Robert Milton Cato (3 June 1915 – 10 February 1997) was a socialist Vincentian politician who served as the first Prime Minister of Saint Vincent and the Grenadines, and also held the offices Premier of Saint Vincent and Chief Minister of Saint Vincent before independence. Cato was the leader of the Saint Vincent Labour Party, and led the country through independence in 1979.

Life and career
Robert Milton Cato was born in Saint Vincent, British Windward Islands on 3 June 1915.  He attended the St. Vincent Grammar School from 1928 to 1933. On leaving school, the young Cato was articled to a Barrister-at-law in Kingstown, and began his career in law and was called to the Bar, Middle Temple in 1948. In 1945, he joined the First Canadian Army, attained the rank of Sergeant and gave active service in the Second World War in France, Belgium, Holland and Germany. Robert Milton Cato was married to Lucy-Ann Alexandra Cato.

After returning to Saint Vincent, Cato became involved in politics. In 1955 he co-founded the Saint Vincent Labour Party.

Elected to the office of Chief Minister on 19 May 1967, as head of the St. Vincent Labour Party, Mr. Cato did much to improve the economic standing of the island.  He was St. Vincent's first Premier on the island's entry to Statehood on 27 October 1969. Cato held the additional portfolio of Minister of Finance. He was out of government during the period 1972 to 1974 following his party's defeat. Cato's Labour Party lost elections in 1972 and the opposition leader, James Fitz-Allen Mitchell became Premier. Cato's party and its coalition partners won elections in 1974, and he became the premier and minister of finance again.

Robert Milton Cato led Saint Vincent and the Grenadines to complete independence from Britain on 27 October 1979, and is known as 'The Father of Independence'. He took the offices of Prime Minister and Minister of Finance.
Mr. Cato the longtime representative of the West St. George Constituency, retired from active politics following his party's defeat in the 1984 general elections.  He died on 10 February 1997 at the age of 81.  His hope was for unity in Vincentian society and a brighter future for the people.  The Kingstown General Hospital was renamed The Milton Cato Memorial Hospital in his honour in October 2000.

Further reading

References

1915 births
1997 deaths
Prime Ministers of Saint Vincent and the Grenadines
Finance ministers of Saint Vincent and the Grenadines
Members of the House of Assembly of Saint Vincent and the Grenadines
People from Saint Vincent (Antilles)
Saint Vincent Labour Party politicians
British Saint Vincent and the Grenadines people
Members of the Privy Council of the United Kingdom